Denis Cioban (born June 27, 1985 in Chişinău) is a Moldovan road bicycle racer.

Palmares 

2006
3rd in Prix de la Mi-Août

1st in Stage 3, Cupa Autoconstruct
3rd in Stage 4, Cupa Autoconstruct
3rd in Cupa Autoconstruct
2nd in Prologue, GP Tell

External links 
 

Moldovan male cyclists
1985 births
Living people